Slobodanka Radović (born 11 April 1973 in Zagreb, SFR Yugoslavia) is a former Croatian female professional basketball player.

References

External links
Profile at eurobasket.com
Profile at fibaeurope.com

1973 births
Living people
Basketball players from Zagreb
Croatian women's basketball players
Forwards (basketball)
Croatian expatriate basketball people in Slovenia